Genna is an Italian surname. Notable people with the surname include:

Angelo Genna (1898–1925), Italian mobster of the Genna crime family
Mike Genna (1895–1925), Italian mobster of the Genna crime family
Tony Genna (1890–1925), Italian mobster of the Genna crime family
Vincenzo Genna (1888–1931), Italian mobster of the Genna crime family
Francesca Genna, Italian academic
Irene Genna, Italian actress

Italian-language surnames